HMS Senator was an  destroyer, which served with the Royal Navy during the First World War, Greco-Turkish War and Russian Civil War. The S class were a development of the previous , and Senator was the first of six constructed by Denny. Senator was launched on 2 April 1918 and joined the Mediterranean Fleet. After the Armistice that ended the First World War, the destroyer continued to serve in active duty, both in the Mediterranean and the Black Seas. For example, in 1919, the ship helped cover the evacuation of Russian troops from Batumi. In 1925, Senator was placed in reserve and, in 1936, was given to Thos. W. Ward of Sheffield in part-exchange for the liner .

Design and development

Senator was one of thirty-three Admiralty  destroyers ordered by the British Admiralty on 7 April 1917 as part of the Eleventh War Construction Programme. Differences with the R class were minor, such as having the searchlight moved aft.

Two funnels were fitted.

Armament consisted of three QF  Mk IV guns on the ship's centreline.  One was mounted raised on the forecastle, one on a platform between the funnels and one aft. The ship also mounted a single  2-pounder pom-pom anti-aircraft gun for air defence. Four  torpedo tubes were fitted in two twin rotating mounts aft. The ship was designed to mount two additional  torpedo tubes either side of the superstructure but this required the forecastle plating to be cut away, making the vessel very wet, so they were removed. The weight saved enabled the heavier Mark V 21-inch torpedo to be carried. The ship had a complement of 90 officers and ratings.

Construction and career
Laid down on 10 July 1917 by William Denny and Brothers in Dumbarton with the yard number 1098, Senator was launched on 2 April the following year. The name was given in honour of the members of the Roman Senate. The vessel was the first with the name to serve in the Royal Navy, and the first of six of the class to be built by the yard. Senator was completed on 7 June and joined the Adriatic Squadron of the Mediterranean Fleet. A trial platform was fitted aft to test launching aircraft while travelling full speed astern. However, the trial was a failure and the platform was removed soon after.

After the Armistice that ended the First World War, Senator joined the Sixth Destroyer Flotilla. The ship subsequently voyaged through the Bosporus into the Black Sea to assist in efforts to evacuate people at risk from the conflicts in the region, both the Greco-Turkish War and the Russian Civil War. On 21 September 1923, the destroyer was transferred to the Seventh Destroyer Flotilla of the Atlantic Fleet. Two years later, on 10 December 1925, the ship was placed in the Reserve Fleet at Devonport.

On 22 April 1930, the London Naval Treaty was signed, which limited total destroyer tonnage in the Royal Navy. The force was looking to introduce more modern destroyers and so needed to retire some of the older vessels. Senator was therefore chosen as one of twenty-two destroyers given to Thos. W. Ward of Sheffield in exchange for the liner . In consequence, on 7 September 1936, the ship was handed over to be broken up at Jarrow.

Pennant numbers

References

Citations

Bibliography

 
 
 
 
 
 
 
 
 
 

1918 ships
S-class destroyers (1917) of the Royal Navy
Ships built on the River Clyde
World War I destroyers of the United Kingdom